Hamish Clark (born 26 July 1965) is a Scottish actor and entertainer. He has performed widely as a supporting actor in a variety of media including motion picture, stage, television and radio. Clark is well known as the kilt-wearing Duncan McKay in the BBC TV series Monarch of the Glen which was set entirely in Scotland.

Growing up in the Scottish town of Broughty Ferry, Dundee, Clark attended the University of Edinburgh. While at university he studied English literature and performed with the Edinburgh University Theatre Company and the Edinburgh Festival Fringe. He later attended the Welsh College of Music & Drama in Cardiff studying drama as a postgraduate. Before becoming a professional actor, he worked as a clerk in an Edinburgh insurance company. Clark moved to London in 1995 where he pursued a full time career in acting in both dramatic and comic roles and in 1999 was cast as Duncan McKay in Monarch of the Glen. Clark is well recognizable as the face of various advertising campaigns such as that for Vodafone and Budget Direct. In May 2002 he opened the Strathspey Railway's extension to Broomhill which had previously been used as Glenbogle Railway Station in Monarch of the Glen.

Filmography 
 Holby City (TV Series, 2009–2022) as Ken Davies (various episodes)
 White Island (Motion Picture, 2016) as Stuart
 Arrested Development (2013) (TV series) as Band Leader (episode 4)
 Liz & Dick (TV Movie) (2012) Alan Williams (uncredited)
 Rab C. Nesbitt (2011) (TV series) as Simon Bird (season 10, episode 4)
 Time Machine: Rise of the Morlocks (TV Movie) (2012) as Patterson
 The Decoy Bride (Motion picture, 2011) as Angus 
 The Hour, guest presenter (between 6–10 July 2009)
 After the Rain (Motion picture, 2006) as Yvan
 Small Fish (2006) (TV series) as Marcus (pilot episode)
 Blessed (2005) (TV series) as The Green Planet Man (episode 3)
 The Only Boy For Me (Motion picture, 2006) as Gary
 Monarch of the Glen (1999) (TV series) as Duncan McKay (Series 1–7) (1999–2005)
 Piggy Bank (1999) (Short film) as Karl
 Martha, Meet Frank, Daniel and Laurence aka The Very Thought of You (1998) as Sven
 Sentimental Education (Motion picture, 1998) as Rufus
 Bring Me the Head of Mavis Davis (Motion picture, 1997) as John (TV Reporter)
 My Wonderful Life (1997) (TV series) as Roger Graham
 Doctor Who (various character voices) (Audio Series)

Theatre 
 The Albatross 3rd & Main (2017) by Simon David Eden at The Park Theatre (London), London as Gene
 The Agent (2007) by Martin Wagner at The Old Red Lion Theatre, London as Alexander
 Donkeys' Years (2006) by Michael Frayn at the Comedy Theatre, London as Quine
 Phallacy (2005) by Carl Djerassi at New End Theatre, Hampstead as Otto

Other media 
 Dixon of Dock Green (Dramatised radio series – BBC Radio 2008) as Andy Crawford
 The Last Vampire by Willis Hall (Talking Book – BBC Radio Big Toe Books series 2009)
 The Royal Game  (Talking book – BBC Radio 2011)

Advertisements 
 Budget Direct – Insurance Solved (Australia) as Detective Sarge in a TV advertising and print media campaign
 Historic Scotland (2010) TV advertising
 Speak Up For Broadband Highlands & Islands of Scotland Regional development board (2003), TV advertising
 Vodafone (UK) (1998–2001), TV advertising & printed media advertising campaign
 Brand brewery a subsidiary of Heineken (Dutch) (TV advertising, 1999)

Personal life
Clark was brought up in the Broughty Ferry area of Dundee. His great-great-grandfather was a shipwright and his wife was a jute-mill worker. His ancestors worked on an orchard near Perth.

References

External links
 
  Hamish Clark Fansite (Archived)
 Monarch of the Glen : Live Chat with Hamish Clark

1965 births
Living people
Alumni of the University of Edinburgh
Scottish male film actors
Scottish male television actors
Male actors from Dundee
People from Broughty Ferry